Elections to Larne Borough Council were held on 7 June 2001 on the same day as the other Northern Irish local government elections. The election used three district electoral areas to elect a total of 15 councillors.

Election results

Note: "Votes" are the first preference votes.

Districts summary

|- class="unsortable" align="centre"
!rowspan=2 align="left"|Ward
! % 
!Cllrs
! % 
!Cllrs
! %
!Cllrs
! %
!Cllrs
! % 
!Cllrs
!rowspan=2|TotalCllrs
|- class="unsortable" align="center"
!colspan=2 bgcolor="" | DUP
!colspan=2 bgcolor="" | UUP
!colspan=2 bgcolor="" | Alliance
!colspan=2 bgcolor="" | SDLP
!colspan=2 bgcolor="white"| Others
|-
|align="left"|Coast Road
|bgcolor="#D46A4C"|28.7
|bgcolor="#D46A4C"|2
|24.2
|1
|13.7
|1
|17.4
|1
|16.0
|0
|5
|-
|align="left"|Larne Lough
|35.6
|2
|bgcolor="40BFF5"|38.4
|bgcolor="40BFF5"|2
|23.1
|1
|0.0
|0
|2.9
|0
|5
|-
|align="left"|Larne Town
|21.3
|1
|22.3
|1
|5.4
|0
|12.8
|1
|bgcolor="#DDDDDD"|38.2
|bgcolor="#DDDDDD"|2
|5
|-
|- class="unsortable" class="sortbottom" style="background:#C9C9C9"
|align="left"| Total
|28.8
|5
|28.8
|4
|14.5
|2
|9.6
|2
|18.3
|2
|15
|-
|}

Districts results

Coast Road

1997: 2 x UUP, 1 x DUP, 1 x SDLP, 1 x Independent Nationalist
2001: 2 x DUP, 1 x UUP, 1 x SDLP, 1 x Alliance
1997-2001 Change: DUP and Alliance gain from UUP and Independent Nationalist

Larne Lough

1997: 3 x UUP, 1 x DUP, 1 x Alliance
2001: 2 x DUP, 2 x UUP, 1 x Alliance
1997-2001 Change: DUP gain from UUP

Larne Town

1997: 2 x Independent, 1 x DUP, 1 x UUP, 1 x Independent Unionist
2001: 2 x Independent, 1 x DUP, 1 x UUP, 1 x SDLP
1997-2001 Change: SDLP gain from Independent, Independent Unionist becomes Independent

References

Larne Borough Council elections
Larne